Rezsõ Újlaki (13 January 1892 – 5 January 1927) was a Hungarian athlete. He competed in the men's discus throw at the 1912 Summer Olympics.

References

External links

1892 births
1927 deaths
Athletes (track and field) at the 1912 Summer Olympics
Hungarian male discus throwers
Olympic athletes of Hungary